LW may refer to:

Arts and entertainment
 Life's Work, a 1990s American situation comedy
 Lethal Weapon, a 1987 film
 Love Wrecked, a 2005 romantic comedy film
 L.W. (album), the seventeenth studio album by King Gizzard & the Lizard Wizard

Businesses and organizations
 Lam Woo, Sheng Kung Hui Lam Woo Memorial Secondary School
 Latham & Watkins, a lawfirm and owner of the Domain LW.com
 Luftwaffe, the German air force
 Pacific Wings (IATA airline designator LW)

Science 
 Lawrencium, a chemical element with former symbol Lw (now Lr)
 Longwave, a frequency band in radio communications
 Sound power level, Lw

Software
 LightWave, a 3D rendering software package
 LimeWire, a discontinued file sharing program

Other uses 
 Left wing, a forward position in ice hockey
 Left winger, a position in association football
 Low water, aka low tide, in nautical use
 Lutheran Worship, a hymnal of The Lutheran Church–Missouri Synod
 LessWrong, an online discussion forum.